Song of Phoenix (Chinese: 思美人) is a 2017 Chinese television series adapted from Liang Zhenhua's namesake novel, focusing on the legendary life of great Chinese poet Qu Yuan from the Warring States Period (475-221BC). It stars Ma Ke as the titular protagonist, alongside Viann Zhang, Qiao Zhenyu and Jackson Yi from TFBoys. It aired on Hunan TV from 28 April to 10 June 2017.

Synopsis 
It tells the story of Qu Yuan, a Chinese poet and government official known for his accomplishments during the Warring States Era. In the fictionalized dramatization, Qu Yuan falls in love with a slave girl named Mo Chou Nu. Their love is a forbidden romance, which is complicated by palace politics and the affairs of the nation. Motivated by his love for his country, Qu Yuan embarks on a difficult endeavor to save his people.

Cast
Ma Ke as Qu Yuan
Jackson Yi as young Qu Yuan
Viann Zhang as Mo Chou Nu
Qiao Zhenyu as King Huai of Chu 
Li Zifeng as Qu You 
Liang Tian as Zhao Bixia 
Liu Yun as Zheng Xiu
Lan Xi as Queen of Nan
Li Yuxuan as Zhang Yi 
Peng Bo as Zhuang Qiao 
Ning Xin as Concubine Tian 
Li Enxi as Ying Sheng 
Ding Yingying as Qing'er
Kelly Niu Tien as Empress Dowager
Gallen Lo as King Huiwen of Qin
Wu Yang as Luo Lan 
Yin Zhusheng as Qu Buoyong
Wu Qianqian as Bo Hui
Huang Xiaowan as Mi Bazi
Lan Ge as Cai Wei 
Wang Xinyu as Liu Waizui
Dou Jinhan as Mu Yi

Soundtrack

Reception 
Though the series premiered with 2.18% ratings and ranked first in its time slot, its ratings rapidly dropped in the next few episodes. It was criticized for distortion of history, absurd plot and characters as well as poor CG effects. Despite the criticism, Phoenix was popular among teenagers and young viewers in their early 20s and the series averaged 18 million views per episode. The series earned a 3.3 out of more than 13,000 user reviews.

Ratings 

 Highest ratings are marked in red, lowest ratings are marked in blue

References

External links
 Song of Phoenix on Douban

Chinese romance television series
Chinese historical television series
2017 Chinese television series debuts
Television shows based on Chinese novels
2017 Chinese television series endings